Thermaikos is a suburban municipality of the regional unit of Thessaloniki, Greece. It consists of the municipal units Thermaikos, Epanomi and Michaniona. The municipal unit Thermaikos is subdivided into the communities Peraia, Neoi Epivates (Bahçe Çiflik) and Agia Triada. The municipality Thermaikos has an area of 133.41 km2 and the municipal unit Thermaikos has an area of 20.300 km2. Thermaikos stretches for 10 km along the southeastern coast of the Thermaic Gulf. The seat of the municipality is in Peraia.

Municipality
The municipality of Thermaikos was formed at the 2011 local government reform by the merger of the following 3 former municipalities, that became municipal units:
Epanomi
Michaniona
Thermaikos

References

Populated places in Thessaloniki (regional unit)
Municipalities of Central Macedonia